Christina McHale and Ajla Tomljanović were the defending champions, but they did not compete in the juniors this year.

Jana Čepelová and Chantal Škamlová won the tournament, defeating Tímea Babos and Gabriela Dabrowski in the final, 7–6(7–1), 6–2.

Seeds

Draw

Finals

Top half

Bottom half

External links 
 Main draw

Girls Doubles
Australian Open, 2010 Girls' Doubles